Florent Muslija (born 6 July 1998) is a Kosovan professional footballer who plays as a midfielder for  club Paderborn and the Kosovo national team.

Club career

Karlsruher SC
On 21 May 2017, Muslija made his debut as professional footballer in a 2–1 away defeat against Eintracht Braunschweig after coming on as a substitute at 70th minute in place of Kai Luibrand. Three days after the debut, he signed a two-year professional contract with Karlsruher SC. On 9 November 2017, Muslija extended his contract prematurely until 2021.

Hannover 96
On 31 August 2018, Muslija in last day of the 2018 summer transfer window signed a four-year contract with Bundesliga club Hannover 96. Hannover 96 reportedly paid a €2 million transfer fee. His debut with Hannover 96 came on 30 September in Matchday 6 of 2018–19 Bundesliga against Eintracht Frankfurt after coming on as a substitute at 69th minute in place of Julian Korb.

SC Paderborn
On 2 January 2022, Muslija signed a one-and-a-half-year contract with 2. Bundesliga club SC Paderborn and received squad number 30. Thirteen days later, he made his debut in a 2–1 away win against 1. FC Nürnberg after being named in the starting line-up. Seven days after debut, Muslija scored his first goals for SC Paderborn in his second appearance for the club in a 3–4 home defeat over Werder Bremen in 2. Bundesliga.

International career

Germany

Under-20
On 25 August 2017, Muslija received a call-up from Germany U20 for the unofficial friendly match against Greuther Fürth and 2017–18 Under 20 Elite League match against Czech Republic U20. On 7 September 2018, he made his debut with Germany U20 in a 2018–19 Under 20 Elite League match against Czech Republic U20 after coming on as a substitute at 62nd minute in place of Linton Maina.

Kosovo
On 21 June 2019, The Football Federation of Kosovo confirmed through a communiqué that Muslija had decided to play for the Kosovo national team. On 30 August 2019, Muslija received a call-up from Kosovo for the UEFA Euro 2020 qualifying matches against Czech Republic and England. On 7 September 2019, he made his debut with Kosovo in a UEFA Euro 2020 qualifying match against Czech Republic after coming on as a substitute at 56th minute in place of Edon Zhegrova.

Career statistics

Club

International

References

External links

1998 births
Living people
People from Achern
Sportspeople from Freiburg (region)
Kosovo Albanians
Kosovan footballers
Kosovo international footballers
German footballers
German people of Kosovan descent
German people of Albanian descent
Germany youth international footballers
Association football midfielders
2. Bundesliga players
3. Liga players
Karlsruher SC players
Bundesliga players
Hannover 96 players
SC Paderborn 07 players
Footballers from Baden-Württemberg